Hit After Hit is the debut album from The Briefs, released in 2000 on both CD and white, red, pink, and clear vinyl.

Track listing
 Poor and Weird 
 Run the Other Way
 Silver Bullet 
 Rotten Love
 I'm a Raccoon
 Sylvia
 Where Did He Go?
 New Shoes 
 Knife
 Year Long Summer
 New Case
 Big Dog 
 Dolly Parton

References

2000 debut albums
Albums produced by Martin Feveyear
The Briefs albums
BYO Records albums